Thomas C. Hackett (c. 1798 – October 8, 1851) was an American politician and lawyer from the state of Georgia who served in the United States Congress.

Hackett was born in Georgia. He was the solicitor general of the Cherokee circuit from 1841 to 1843 and was elected to the Georgia Senate in 1845. In 1848, Hackett was elected to the United States House of Representatives as a Democrat to represent Georgia's 5th congressional district in the 31st United States Congress. He served one term from March 4, 1849, through March 3, 1851. Hackett died in Marietta, Georgia, on October 8, 1851.

References

 Political Graveyard entry for Thomas C. Hackett

1851 deaths
Georgia (U.S. state) lawyers
Democratic Party Georgia (U.S. state) state senators
Year of birth uncertain
Democratic Party members of the United States House of Representatives from Georgia (U.S. state)